Kali is a Sudanese character in the 1911 novel In Desert and Wilderness by Polish writer Henryk Sienkiewicz.  He is one of the earliest Polish literary depictions of a black person and has thus been cited as having shaped Polish perceptions of black people.

Plot
A Polish boy, Staś, and an English girl named Nel, are caught up in the outbreak of the Mahdist War in Sudan. They end up travelling through the desert accompanied by two black people, Kali (the son of a tribal chief) and a girl named Mea, whom Staś has freed from Arab rebels. They encounter a number of wonders and perils. During these adventures, Kali is "brave, creative and honourable" and later he becomes "a fair and successful leader of his people."

Kali in Polish culture
Kali speaks broken English and many of his phrases have become frequently quoted, especially "Kali jeść, Kali pić" which means "Kali eat, Kali drink" (the lack of verb-subject agreement and conjugation being due to his lack of knowledge).

According to Time Magazine, 'Kali has been immortalized in the Polish language in the saying, “Kali’s morality,” which means “double standard"' Kali says at one point: “If somebody takes Kali’s cow, it’s a bad deed. If Kali takes somebody’s cow, it’s a good deed.”

References

Afro-Polish history
Black people in literature
Literary characters introduced in 1911